José Medeles is an American musician and author based in Portland, Oregon. Medeles opened Revival Drum Shop in 2009, a store dedicated to vintage and custom drums. He currently leads 1939 Ensemble, a drums, vibraphone, trumpet, guitar, and noise quartet. Medeles has played live and/or recorded with The Breeders, Kim Deal, Ben Harper, Donavon Frankenreiter, Joey Ramone, Modest Mouse, 22 Jacks, Mike Watt, Laura Veirs, Scout Nibblet, CJ Ramone, Face to Face, Rocco DeLuca, John Davis, Steve Soto, Holloys, Jackson United, Io Perry, Tito & Tarantula, Drunken Prayer, Dustbowl Holler (Tom Waits Tribute), Custom Made Scare, Los Infernos, and Crank Williams.

Discography

Albums 
Random Underdog Stories (2002)
Solo Drum: Tale of a Dysfunctional Drummer (2006)
Art of Slowness: The Halfling Session (2018)
Railroad Cadences & Melancholic Anthems (2022)

Bibliography 
The Stoic Drummer (2019)
A Drummers Ethos (2022)
Who Will Play My Drums When I'm Gone? (2022)

References

American rock drummers
The Breeders members
Living people
1972 births